Nam Sang-ji (born on December 14, 1989) is a South Korean actress. She made her acting debut in 2013 film Marriage Blue. Since then she has appeared in number of films. She is better known for her role in daily family drama Sisters-in-Law (2017). She appeared in films such as: Lucid Dream (2017) and Ashfall (2019) among others. In 2022, she is appearing as main lead of KBS's daily drama Bravo, My Life.

Career
Nam Sang-ji is affiliated to artist management company Bingo One Ent Co. She made her debut in 2013 film Marriage Blue. She is alumni of Department of Acting, Kyonggi University.

In 2016 Nam appeared in period drama film Spirits' Homecoming portraying role of Zhao Fei. She also featured in its sequel Spirits' Homecoming, Unfinished Story. The film was a commercial success garnering more than 3.58 million viewers.

In 2017, she was seen in MBC's Sisters-in-Law as Park Ji-ho. she was praised for her "lovely charm" and "romantic acting". She was termed as "nice find".

In 2022, she got her first main role in KBS daily drama Bravo, My Life portraying a single mother who chooses to become  mother of her nephew.

Filmography

Films

Television series

Awards and nominations

References

External links
 
 Nam Sang-ji on Daum 

Living people
1998 births
South Korean child actresses
21st-century South Korean actresses
South Korean film actresses
South Korean television actresses
Kyonggi University alumni